Simon Lei Chang-hsia (11 October 1915 – 1970) was a Chinese clergyman and auxiliary bishop for the Roman Catholic Diocese of Fenyang. He became ordained in 1939. He was appointed bishop in 1949. He died in 1970.

References

20th-century Roman Catholic bishops in China
1915 births
1970 deaths